"C'est la vie" is a song by Algerian raï singer Khaled. It was produced by Moroccan-Swedish producer RedOne and released on Universal Music Division AZ becoming a summer hit for Khaled in France in 2012.

Content
The song is bilingual, with the main verses in Algerian Darja Arabic and the chorus in French. The chorus repeats the phrase (translation in parenthesis and italics).

Charts
The song is considered to be a comeback for Khaled in France after a three-year absence in the charts. Released in July 2012, the song entered the official French Singles Chart at number 30 and later peaked at number 4. In addition to its success in France, it became very popular throughout Belgium and Slovakia, where it reached the top 10. In 2013, the single was certified platinum by the Belgian Entertainment Association. The song also charted in the Netherlands, Romania, Sweden, and Switzerland and received radio airplay in Canada. "C’est La Vie" sold over one million copies in the European market, 1.8 million copies in the Middle East and North Africa, and over 4 million copies worldwide. The album reached number 5 on SNEP, the official French Albums Chart.

Chart performance

Weekly charts

Year-end charts

Cover versions

Marc Anthony version

In 2013, American singer Marc Anthony covered the Khaled song as a salsa tune titled "Vivir Mi Vida" ("Live My Life") for his studio album 3.0. This version was produced by Sergio George and recorded  at The Hit Factory Criteria in Miami, Florida. Anthony performed it live at the 2013 Latin Billboard Music Awards. The music video, directed by Carlos Perez of Elastic People, was released on September 10, 2013. "Vivir Mi Vida" won a Latin Grammy Award in 2013 for Record of the Year and holds the record for the second-longest run inside the top-five in the Billboard Latin Songs, with 51 weeks. A "Pop" version was also produced using the instrumental of the original Khaled version and is included on the album.

In 2017, Anthony's former wife Jennifer Lopez covered the song in her "Spotify Session" as a tribute to his late mother and her former mother-in-law. As of May 2021, the music video for Anthony's version of the song has received over 1 billion views on YouTube.

Track listing

Chart performance

Weekly charts

Year-end charts

Decade-end charts

All-time charts

Certifications

Hashem Melech 

Israeli singer Gad Elbaz created a new version of the song calling it "Hashem Melech" (in Hebrew ה' מלך) as a sort of contemporary Jewish worship song based on and adapted from "C'est la vie".

The Israeli version released in January 2013 as a duet between Gad Elbaz and his singer father Beni Elbaz contains Hebrew and French lyrics, though the Hebrew lyrics are not related to Khaled's all-French original lyrics and more geared to religious content. The chorus repeats the phrases (translation in parenthesis and italics)

Elbaz also released an all-Hebrew version of the song. "Hashem Melech" was a minor hit in Israel and in Orthodox Jewish circles worldwide.

The Hebrew lyrics in the refrain are the same as those of a famous song also titled "Hashem Melech" by the well-known Jewish singer Yosef Karduner.

In September 2015, Elbaz released another limited version featuring additional vocals by the young Israeli child singer Yosef Chaim.

Hashem Melech 2.0

In 2016, Elbaz teamed with Hasidic rapper Nissim (full name Nissim Baruch Black, born Damian Jamohl Black and a convert from Islam to Christianity and eventually to Judaism) to create a rap-infused version of the song now titled "Hashem Melech 2.0" to distinguish it from the original Elbaz version. The rap by Nissim  is primarily English language, and is said to dominate the song, wrapping around and throughout the elements of the original "1.0" song.

Still a bilingual song, "Hashem Melech" now featured Hebrew and English lyrics instead. Elbaz' original French lyrics were dropped in favor of English in the new version, but his Hebrew lyrics were retained for the new version. Nissim's rap segments were all in English. The popularity of the second version far exceeded that of the first.

Daniel Finkelman created a sophisticated, exuberant, multiracial dance video of the new version, set against the New York City skyline and streetscape. The New-York themed music video features Elbaz and Nissim dancing and delivering their religious message dancing joyously through the New York city streets and on skyscraper rooftops, amidst a changing New York skyline, encouraging listeners to believe in a better tomorrow.

Ali B version

In 2017, the Dutch rapper Ali B released the single "Voy a Bailar", largely an adaptation of the Khaled song but with adaptations from the Latin "Vivir Mi Vida" cover from Marc Anthony. Ali B added rap lyrics in Dutch. The release featured additional vocals by Boef, Rolf Sanchez and RedOne.

Charts

Weekly charts

Year-end charts

In popular culture
The song became popular in Indonesia, a majority-Muslim country. A political campaign there in early 2017 developed a theme song called "Kobarkan Semangat Jakarta". Based on "C'est la vie" and "Hashem Malach", it created controversy as no attribution was given to either work. This sent the Khaled French version and surprisingly the Elbaz Hebrew version "Hashem Melech" to trend on Indonesian Twitter.

See also
 List of number-one songs of 2013 (Colombia)
List of number-one Billboard Hot Latin Songs of 2013
List of Billboard number-one Latin songs of 2014

References

2012 songs
2012 singles
2013 singles
Macaronic songs
Khaled (musician) songs
Marc Anthony songs
Song recordings produced by RedOne
Songs written by Alex P
Songs written by Björn Djupström
Song recordings produced by Sergio George
Number-one singles in Colombia
Spanish-language songs
2017 singles
RedOne songs
Songs written by RedOne
Songs written by Bilal Hajji
Latin Grammy Award for Record of the Year
Sony Music Latin singles
Universal Music Group singles
Songs containing the I–V-vi-IV progression